Stephensia is a genus of the small and very small moths of the family Elachistidae.

Species
 Stephensia abbreviatella (Stainton, 1851)
 Stephensia armata Sruoga, 2003
 Stephensia brunichella (Linnaeus, 1767)
 Stephensia calpella (Walsingham, 1908)
 Stephensia cedronellae (Walsingham, 1908)
 Stephensia cunilae Braun, 1930
 Stephensia integra (Falkovich, 1986)
 Stephensia jalmarella Kaila, 1992
 Stephensia major (Kearfott, 1907)
 Stephensia staudingeri Nielson and Traugatt-Olson, 1981
 Stephensia unipunctella Nielsen & Traugott-Olsen, 1978
 Stephensia ussuriella Sinev, 1992

References

 

Elachistidae
Taxa named by Henry Tibbats Stainton